Debajo de un pino is the first album by Cuentos Chinos, released in 1987. The best songs from this album are "Es por la mañana el niño sale de la cabaña con su caña para ir a pescar" (Early morning the kid leaves his cabin just to go fishing), "Debajo de un pino" (Under a pine tree), and their biggest hit "Cuatro Mexicanos" (Four Mexicans).

The album cover depicts a Chinese lion, these lions, also called Foo Lions are known as "happiness dogs" or "heavenly dogs" and is believed to have powerful mythic protective powers that has traditionally stood in front of Chinese Imperial palaces, temples, emperors' tombs, government offices, and the homes of government officials and the wealthy from the Han Dynasty (206 BC-AD 220), until the end of the empire in 1911.

Track listing

 Es Por La Mañana, El Niño Sale De La Cabaña Con Su Caña Para Ir A Pescar (Early morning the kid leaves his cabin just to go fishing)	2:55
 Te Quiero Loro (Love you/parrot)	3:25
 San Serenin	3:43
 Vivo En La Mina (I live in the mine)	2:23
 Debajo De Un Pino (Under a pine tree)	3:03
 Cuatro Mexicanos (Four mexicans)	3:20
 Tú Serás Mi Beibi (You'll be my baby)	3:30
 Vuelve A Mi (Come back to me)	3:50
 Aquel Verano En Benicasim (That summer on Benicasim)	2:30

All songs written by Alejandro Carda, Enrique Renau, Juan Enrique Torner

Singles

 Cuatro Mexicanos/Vivo en la mina
 Tu serás mi beibi/Te Quiero Loro
 Es por la mañana, el niño sale de la cabaña con su caña para ir a pescar/San Serenín

Label: PM Records

Catalog: 832 254-4

Format: Cassette, Album

Country: Spain

Released: 1987

Gender: Electronic, Pop, Rock

Style: Pop Rock, Synth-pop

1987 debut albums
Cuentos Chinos albums